The second season of the American drama television series 24, also known as Day 2, was first broadcast from October 29, 2002, to May 20, 2003, on Fox. The season begins and ends at 8:00 a.m. The season premiere originally aired without commercial interruption, and has an extended running time of approximately 51 minutes, as opposed to the standard 43 minutes.

Season overview
The second season is set 18 months after season one. The season's main plot follows the work of now-President of the United States of America David Palmer and Counter Terrorist Unit Agent Jack Bauer to stop terrorists from detonating a nuclear bomb in Los Angeles. Introduced into the situation is Kate Warner, a woman who ends up getting vital information related to CTU's mission.

This season can essentially be broken into two acts:
 The first act involves CTU attempting to stop a Middle Eastern terrorist cell from detonating a nuclear bomb in Los Angeles.
 In the second act, Jack and the CTU try to prevent a misdirected retaliatory strike from the U.S. by investigating a possibly forged piece of evidence.

Major subplots
 Following the death of his wife and his unborn baby at the end of Season 1, Jack Bauer retires from CTU.
 Kim is on the run, having rescued a young girl from her abusive father.
 Kate Warner suspects that her sister's Middle Eastern fiancé is a terrorist.
 CTU is blown up with C4 to cripple its ability to find the bomb.
 George Mason, Director of CTU, is exposed to a lethal dose of radiation.
 Jack tries to repair his relationship with his daughter Kim and spends much of the day worrying about her safety.
 Jack develops a heart condition after being tortured by terrorists.
 President Palmer faces traitors in his own cabinet, who attempt to remove him from power to advance their own agenda.
 The personal relationship between Tony Almeida and Michelle Dessler begins to develop.
 The relationship between Jack Bauer and Kate Warner also begins to develop.

Summary
The season starts and ends at: 8:00 a.m. (L.A. time); the first scene of the season occurs in Seoul, South Korea (midnight, Seoul time).

The first fifteen hours deal with finding and disposing of the nuclear bomb. After the bomb is detonated away from the city, the story focuses on the United States' response to the thwarted attack, and in particular the nation's retaliation against the people responsible for planning it. A recorded conversation between a terrorist involved with the bomb and high-ranking officials of three Middle Eastern countries (which are never specified) is used to implicate those countries in the plot. However, due to Jack Bauer's doubts, Palmer is reluctant to order military action against them until he has absolute proof that the recording is genuine. A majority of his Cabinet then vote to relieve Palmer of his position as President under Section 4 of the Twenty-fifth Amendment, believing his hesitation to be a sign of indecision and weakness, and is therefore indicative of his inability to lead the country effectively.  The vice president, James Prescott, is elevated to the presidency and orders military strikes against the three countries to continue.

Jack, Michelle and Tony race to find the evidence that the recording is a forgery, resulting in the discovery that a group of European and American businessmen fabricated it in order to wage war with the Middle East, and planned to benefit from the resulting skyrocketing oil prices. Once the evidence is produced, the strikes are called off and Palmer is reinstated as President, thanks largely to his ex-wife Sherry Palmer (who risks her life for the evidence, and who also had an indirect hand in the day's events).  The eight cabinet members and Vice President tender their resignations (Palmer does not accept them), and Palmer then tells his staff that he believes that the strictest evidence of hostile intent is required before waging war. The President does however, relieve his Chief of Staff Mike Novick, who did not support him until the eleventh hour, despite being his most trusted confidant.

Like in Season One, Season Two ends with a surprise twist. The nuclear bomb situation is resolved without massive loss of life (besides George Mason, who had radiation poisoning and convinced Jack to let him fly the plane) but President Palmer collapses after giving a speech, having been attacked with a biological weapon by Mandy in an assassination attempt. Viewers were forced to wait until the third season to see whether Palmer survived the attack. The sudden shift from a nuclear to biological threat also foreshadows the third season, which initially centers on the threat of an engineered virus being set loose on the public.

24: The Game dealt with the time between Seasons Two and Three.  President Palmer is incapacitated from the biological weapon inflicted by Mandy, and many of the duties are being handled by his Vice President.

Characters

Starring
 Kiefer Sutherland as Jack Bauer (24 episodes)
 Sarah Wynter as Kate Warner (24 episodes)
 Elisha Cuthbert as Kim Bauer (22 episodes)
 Xander Berkeley as George Mason (15 episodes)
 Penny Johnson Jerald as Sherry Palmer (13 episodes)
 Carlos Bernard as Tony Almeida (24 episodes)
 Dennis Haysbert as President David Palmer (24 episodes)

Guest starring

Episodes

Production
Season 2 marked the first of three uses of the show's Air Force One set. Xander Berkeley's character spent much of the season dying of radiation poisoning and various actors commented that they thought the story played out very well. Kiefer Sutherland became a producer for the second season. In an interview, he joked that "Fox originally did not want to give me a raise so they gave me a title." In the same interview, Sutherland mentions that he tried suggesting a storyline detail which got rejected by the writers. One idea that did get accepted by the writers was Carlos Bernard's idea to mention London's "Finsbury Park Mosque" during an interrogation scene. Shortly after the season aired, authorities raided this mosque, having discovered that radical groups were indeed meeting there.

Trailer
The original trailer titled "Get Ready" aired in early September 2002, slightly more than a month before the season premiere. It is only 15 seconds long and features a number of shots from season 2 in quick succession. It ends with Jack telling his daughter that she has to leave Los Angeles.

Reception
The second season received critical acclaim, scoring a Metacritic rating of 83/100 based on 23 reviews. On Rotten Tomatoes, the season has an approval rating of 94% with an average score of 7.2 out of 10 based on 18 reviews. The website's critical consensus reads, "24s sophomore outing is not as elegantly structured as its predecessor, but the series firmly puts to rest any fears that its propulsive thrills were a one-time novelty."

For this season, Kiefer Sutherland won the Screen Actors Guild Award for Outstanding Performance by a Male Actor in a Drama Series and the Satellite Award for Best Actor – Television Series Drama (for the second time in a row). Sean Callery, the show's composer won the Primetime Emmy Award for Outstanding Music Composition for a Series. The alleged absurdity of Kim Bauer's run-in with the cougar has created an enduring reference in the television review community.

Award nominations

Home media releases

References

External links
 

24 (TV series)
2002 American television seasons
2003 American television seasons